Speaker Denison's rule is a constitutional convention established by John Evelyn Denison, who was Speaker of the British House of Commons from 1857 to 1872, regarding how the Speaker decides on their casting vote in the event of a tie in the number of votes cast in a division.

In 1867, when a tie arose on a motion on Fellowships at Trinity College, Dublin, Denison gave his casting vote against the motion, declaring that any decision must be approved by the majority. The rule as subsequently adopted is that the Speaker, in any division upon a bill, should vote to leave a bill in its existing form.

The principle is always to vote in favour of further debate, or, where it has been previously decided to have no further debate or in some specific instances, to vote in favour of the status quo. Thus, the Speaker will vote:
 against the final reading of a bill (and against holding such readings immediately rather than in the future, to allow for time to consider the matter)
 in favour of earlier readings of bills (and in favour of holding such readings immediately rather than in the future, to allow for further debate)
 against amendments to bills
 against motions of no confidence
 in favour of disagreeing with amendments made by the House of Lords 

The thinking behind the rule is that change should only occur if an actual majority vote is in favour of the change. 

Speaker Denison's rule is now a guiding principle in many other bodies that have neutral chairpersons.

Tied votes in the British House of Commons
In the case of a Committee of the Whole House, the presiding officer is the Chairman of Ways and Means or a Deputy Chairman. In other cases of plenary session, the presiding officer is the Speaker or a Deputy Speaker. Votes of smaller Commons committees are not listed.

Notes

References

External links
 List of all votes decided by the Speaker's casting vote since 1801

 Constitution of the United Kingdom
 House of Commons of the United Kingdom
 Westminster system